Lisa Albano-Fu (born March 24, 1970) is an American former professional tennis player.

A native of Peabody, Massachusetts, Albano attended Pingree School and was a collegiate tennis player for UC Berkeley, where she earned four All-American selections. She was runner-up to Sandra Birch in the final of the 1991 NCAA championships and was named ITA Regional Player of the Year in 1992.

After college she competed briefly on the professional tour and had a best singles world ranking of 366, with main draw appearances at the Virginia Slims of Newport. She won both the singles and doubles titles of an ITF tournament in Freeport, Bahamas in 1992.

Albano, who is married with two sons, is a member of the California Athletics Hall of Fame and New England Tennis Hall of Fame. She lives in Andover, Massachusetts.

ITF finals

Singles: 2 (1–1)

Doubles: 3 (1–2)

References

External links
 
 

1970 births
Living people
American female tennis players
California Golden Bears women's tennis players
Tennis people from Massachusetts
People from Peabody, Massachusetts
20th-century American women